Siobhan Kathleen Baillie (born 28 August 1981) is a British Conservative Party politician who has served as Member of Parliament (MP) for Stroud since the 2019 general election. Prior to her parliamentary career, she was a family law solicitor, a councillor, and worked for a charity.

Early life
Baillie was born in Crawley, West Sussex, on 28 August 1981, and she moved with her family at the age of eight to Filey, North Yorkshire. She has a younger brother and sister. Her parents separated during her childhood. Baillie moved out of the family home at the age of 15 and left school two years later to work as a legal secretary in Reading, Berkshire. She attended a law school at weekends, and qualified as a family law solicitor in 2010. Baillie also worked as the head of policy and communications for the charity, OnePlusOne.

Political career
Baillie was a councillor in the London Borough of Camden from 2014 to 2018, representing the ward of Frognal and Fitzjohns. As an opposition member she served on the Children, Schools and Families Scrutiny Committee and during the 2016–2017 civic year she chaired a review of mental health service provision for young people.

She stood for the Bermondsey and Old Southwark seat at the 2017 general election. She was third behind the Labour and Liberal Democrat candidates with 13% of the vote. She had previously unsuccessfully sought selection for the Hampstead and Kilburn constituency for the same election, and for the Barnet and Camden London Assembly seat at the 2016 election.

Baillie was selected as the Conservative candidate for Stroud on 31 July 2018. She supported the UK remaining within the EU in the 2016 UK EU membership referendum, but during her 2019 election campaign indicated that she now supported Brexit, to honour the result of the referendum. At the 2019 general election, she was elected as an MP with a majority of 3,840 (5.8%). The seat had been represented by Labour and Co-operative MP David Drew since the 2017 election. Baillie was the first woman to represent the constituency. She has been a member of the Work and Pensions Select Committee since March 2020.

In July 2021, Baillie commented that she opposed the removal of the Blackboy Clock in Stroud as she felt that it was important to leave all statues to "reflect our country's journey in the 20th and 21st centuries toward equality" but did support adding "factual information" to the statue to provide education.  

Baillie endorsed Rishi Sunak in the July–September 2022 Conservative Party leadership election and the subsequent October 2022 Conservative Party leadership election.

Personal life
Baillie is married. The couple have two daughters born in 2020 and 2022.

References

External links

Living people
1981 births
UK MPs 2019–present
Conservative Party (UK) MPs for English constituencies
21st-century British women politicians
Councillors in the London Borough of Camden
Conservative Party (UK) councillors
Female members of the Parliament of the United Kingdom for English constituencies
21st-century English women
21st-century English people
Women councillors in England